Zantedeschia pentlandii, the Sekhukhune golden arum, is a species in the arum family, Araceae.

Description
The leaves are arrow-shaped.

Distribution and habitat
The plant grows in rocky grassland and open woodland between dolerite blocks. The plant is native to Mpumalanga and Limpopo where it occurs from Roossenekal to Dullstroom.

References

pentlandii